A. B. Mirza Azizul Islam is a Bangladeshi bureaucrat and the former Advisor of the Caretaker Government led by Fakhruddin Ahmed. He was in charge of the finance ministry.

Career
Islam is the former chairman of Bangladesh Securities and Exchange Commission. He was the advisor in charge of finance in the Fakhruddin Ahmed Caretaker government.

References

Awami League politicians
Living people
1941 births
Dhaka College alumni
People from Sujanagar Upazila